The 1940 Centenary Gentlemen football team was an American football team that represented the Centenary College of Louisiana as a member of the Louisiana Intercollegiate Conference during the 1940 college football season. In their first year under head coach Jake Hanna, the team compiled a 3–7 record.

Schedule

References

Centenary
Centenary Gentlemen football seasons
Centenary Gentlemen football